Curwensville Area Junior/Senior High School is a public high school located in the borough of Curwensville, Pennsylvania, United States. It serves students from most of south central Clearfield County. The school is part of the Curwensville Area School District. In the 2018–2019 school year there ere 480 students at the school.

Extracurriculars
Curwensville Area School District offers a wide variety of clubs, activities and an extensive sports program. The district maintains an indoor pool which is open to the public some evenings. The Alan Fairman Community Recreation Center is also open to the public.

Sports
The District funds:

Boys
Baseball - AA
Basketball- AA
Football - A
Soccer - A
Wrestling - AA

Girls
Basketball - AA
Golf - AA
Soccer (fall) - A
Softball - AA
Volleyball - A

Junior high school sports

Boys
Baseball
Basketball
Football
Soccer
Wrestling	

Girls
Basketball
Softball
Volleyball
Cheerleading

According to PIAA directory July 2012

References

Public high schools in Pennsylvania
Schools in Clearfield County, Pennsylvania